The American Hotel in Aztec, New Mexico, later known as the Aztec Residential Hotel, was built during 1906–1907.  Located at 300 S. Main, it was listed on the National Register of Historic Places in 1985.

It is a brick building with brick laid in Flemish bond and common bond.  It was refurbished in 1981, including reopening bricked-in second floor windows and constructing a porch.

It later operated as Miss Gail's Inn, then converted to rental units.

References

National Register of Historic Places in New Mexico
Hotel buildings completed in 1907
San Juan County, New Mexico
Hotels in New Mexico